Medyn-Aduyevo was a Soviet Air Force base in Kaluga Oblast, Russia located 56 km northwest of Kaluga. It was a 1960s-era airbase, situated 9 km northeast of the town of Medyn.

By the 1980s or 1990s the airfield had been completely plowed over into pasture. A Degree Confluence Project intersection is along the former southern tarmac. Two confluence hunters did not see any remains or even suspect them, but visit photos clearly show wide clearings and revetments grown over by vegetation.

References

External links
 Degree Confluence Project page for Medyn-Aduyevo location (pages may be in Russian)

Soviet Air Force bases

ar:مدين (روسيا)